J-core is the style of hardcore techno associated with Japanese groups and DJs from the late 1990s onward. It is marked by its usage of samples derived from video games and anime, colorful kawaii imagery and album graphics, and the general borrowing of elements from denpa and otaku culture. The style is featured in video games such as Beatmania IIDX and forms a substantial part of the doujin music scene.

DJ Sharpnel is considered to have pioneered the style in 1998, and in the early 2000s the style spread through Japanese peer-to-peer networks. As anime became popular in the United States and Europe, J-core would also find appreciation among anime fans there, allowing for the development of a Western, J-core-inspired remix culture, as well as for J-core's contribution to the nightcore phenomenon of the early 2010s. J-core is often featured in rhythm games, especially those whose main audience is in Asia or Japan.

History 
J-Core's emergence dates back to the mid to late 1990s, in the height of the hardcore and gabber techno scenes in Europe. Originally called Japcore, the name J-Core is the combined words "japanese", and "hardcore". J-Core is heavily influenced by denpa and otaku culture, usually talking visual or audio samples from video games, anime, and general kawaii imagery.

Notable producers
DJ Chucky
DJ Sharpnel
DJ Technetium
Lemmy
IOSYS
m1dy
REDALiCE
t+pazolite
Techn0rch
Moro
Camellia
Laur
USAO
Kobaryo
RoughSketch
Synthion

References 

Japanese music history
1990s in music
Hardcore music genres